Dennis Gabor College (DGC) is a private educational institution in Budapest, Hungary. It was established in 1992 and named after the Hungarian physicist Dennis Gabor. Since its foundation the College has been operating programs of IT-themed courses. Currently the school offers three different BSc courses, five post-secondary vocational training courses and four postgraduate courses to Hungarian applicants. Since 1992 more than 11,000 students have graduated at Dennis Gabor College.

Dennis Gabor College was among the first few higher education institutions which introduced distance education, and certain e-learning methods. Both of the College's education courses (full-time and distance) are supported with online study content.

References

External links

Universities and colleges in Hungary
Educational institutions established in 1992
1992 establishments in Hungary